Gulf Indian High School or GIHS is a CBSE affiliated school located in the Al Garhoud Area of Dubai . It is a senior secondary school with students from 3-17 of age accommodating classes from KG to 12. Students in 12th prepare for their All India Senior School Certificate Examination (AISSCE) as it is their senior and final year. The school is affiliated to the CBSE, New Delhi. Dominated by discipline and well knit community, assessed by the KHDA it has been coming out with an 'Acceptable' consistently throughout the years.

John M. Thomas, the school's founder and chairman, died in July 2022.

KHDA Inspection Report

The Knowledge and Human Development Authority (KHDA) is an educational quality assurance authority based in Dubai, United Arab Emirates. It undertakes early learning, school and higher learning institution management and rates them as well

A summary of the inspection ratings for Gulf Indian High School.

A summary of all the schools in Dubai's ratings can be found at KHDA School Ratings.

References

Educational institutions established in 1979
Indian international schools in the United Arab Emirates
Schools in Dubai
1979 establishments in the United Arab Emirates